The Edward L. Jones House is a historic house at 5555 North Casa Blanca Drive in Paradise Valley, Arizona.  It is a  property including a two-story adobe house, an adobe pump house, and an adobe and wood-frame barn.  Built in 1932, the main house is a good example of Pueblo and Monterrey adobe revival styles, with walls of colored stucco and a multicolor tile roof.  The roof eaves show exposed viga beams, and the windows are wooden casements, with wrought iron railings.

The house was listed on the National Register of Historic Places in 1996.

See also
 National Register of Historic Places listings in Maricopa County, Arizona

References

External links

Houses on the National Register of Historic Places in Arizona
National Register of Historic Places in Maricopa County, Arizona
Mission Revival architecture in Arizona
Traditional Native American dwellings
Houses in Maricopa County, Arizona
Houses completed in 1932
1932 establishments in Arizona
Pueblo Revival architecture in Arizona